In politics and economics, a Potemkin village is any construction (literal or figurative) whose sole purpose is to provide an external façade to a country that is faring poorly, making people believe that the country is faring better. The term comes from stories of a fake portable village built by Grigory Potemkin, former lover of Empress Catherine II, solely to impress the Empress during her journey to Crimea in 1787. Modern historians agree that accounts of this portable village are exaggerated. The original story was that Potemkin erected phony portable settlements along the banks of the Dnieper River in order to impress the Russian Empress and foreign guests. The structures would be disassembled after she passed, and re-assembled farther along her route to be viewed again as if another example of life.

Origin 
Grigory Potemkin was a minister and lover of the Russian Empress Catherine II. After the 1783 Russian annexation of Crimea from the Ottoman Empire and liquidation of the Cossack Zaporozhian Sich (see New Russia), Potemkin became governor of the region. Crimea had been devastated by the war, and the Muslim Tatar inhabitants of Crimea were viewed as a potential fifth column of the Ottoman Empire. Potemkin's major tasks were to pacify and rebuild by bringing in Russian settlers. In 1787, as a new war was about to break out between Russia and the Ottoman Empire, Catherine II, with her court and several ambassadors, made an unprecedented six-month trip to New Russia. One purpose of this trip was to impress Russia's allies prior to the war. To help accomplish this, Potemkin was said to have set up "mobile villages" on the banks of the Dnieper River. As soon as the barge carrying the Empress and ambassadors arrived, Potemkin's men, dressed as peasants, would populate the village. Once the barge left, the village was disassembled, then rebuilt downstream overnight.

Historical accuracy 
According to Simon Sebag-Montefiore, Potemkin's most comprehensive English-language biographer, the tale of elaborate, fake settlements, with glowing fires designed to comfort the monarch and her entourage as they surveyed the barren territory at night, is largely fictional. Aleksandr Panchenko, an established specialist on 19th-century Russia, used original correspondence and memoirs to conclude that the Potemkin villages are a myth. He writes: "Based on the above said we must conclude that the myth of 'Potemkin villages' is exactly a myth, and not an established fact." He writes that "Potyomkin indeed decorated existing cities and villages, but made no secret that this was a decoration".

The close relationship between Potemkin and the empress could have made it difficult for him to deceive her. Thus, if there were deception, it would have been mainly directed towards the foreign ambassadors accompanying the imperial party.

Although "Potemkin village" has come to mean, especially in a political context, any hollow or false construct, physical or figurative, meant to hide an undesirable or potentially damaging situation, it is possible that the phrase cannot be applied accurately to its own original historical inspiration. According to some historians, some of the buildings were real, and others were constructed to show what the region would look like in the near future, and at least Catherine and possibly also her foreign visitors knew which were which. According to these historians, the claims of deception were part of a defamation campaign against Potemkin.

According to a legend, in 1787, when Catherine passed through Tula on her way back from the trip, the local governor Mikhail Krechetnikov attempted a deception of that kind in order to hide the effects of a bad harvest.

Modern usage

Physical examples
 The Nazi German Theresienstadt concentration camp, called "the Paradise Ghetto" in World War II, was designed as a concentration camp that could be shown to the Red Cross but was really a Potemkin village: attractive at first, but deceptive and ultimately lethal, with high death rates from malnutrition and contagious diseases. It ultimately served as a way-station to Auschwitz-Birkenau.
 Henry A. Wallace, then Vice President of the United States, visited a Soviet penal labor camp in Magadan in 1944 and believed that the prisoners were "volunteers".
 North Korea has a Potemkin village called Kijong-dong inside the Demilitarized Zone, also known as the "Peace Village".
 In 1998, an American company Enron built and maintained a fake trading floor on the sixth story of its headquarters in downtown Houston. The trading floor was used to impress Wall Street analysts attending Enron's annual shareholders meeting and even included rehearsals conducted by Enron executives Kenneth Lay and Jeffrey Skilling.
 Venezuelan President Hugo Chávez fixed up routes that would be visited by foreign dignitaries in his country's capital, Caracas. Workers placed new paint on the streets and painted rocks and other fragments that were inside of potholes.
 In 2010, 22 vacant houses in a blighted part of Cleveland, Ohio, US, were disguised with fake doors and windows painted on the plywood panels used to close them up, so the houses looked occupied. Chicago and Cincinnati have initiated similar programs.
 In preparation for hosting the July 2013 G8 summit in Enniskillen, Northern Ireland, large photographs were put up in the windows of closed shops in the town so as to give the appearance of thriving businesses for visitors driving past them.
 In 2013, before Vladimir Putin's visit to Suzdal, some old and half-ruined houses in the city center were covered with large posters with doors and windows printed on them.
In 2016, the government of Turkmenistan built and opened a village called Berkarar Zaman, but abandoned it soon after opening.
In 2016, Russian military contractors at the Kantemirovskaya Tank Division in Naro-Forminsk, Moscow are said to have hastily constructed facades and hung banners concealing the poor condition of the base prior to a visit from government officials.

Metaphorical usage
 American historian John Lewis Gaddis has suggested that the Cold War Soviet army practiced "Potemkinism", i.e. building just enough capability to create the illusion of more. In 2012, David French wrote that the same can be said of the post-war British army given its limited combat ability.
Donald Trump's business councils have been described as Potemkin Villages after several high-profile CEO participants resigned in August 2017. Trump's The Art of the Deal describes a stunt in which he lured Holiday Inn executives into investing in an Atlantic City, New Jersey, casino by directing his construction manager to rent dozens of pieces of heavy equipment, in advance of a visit by the executives, to move dirt around on the proposed casino site, creating the illusion that construction was under way.
 In the 2018 lawsuit filed against Exxon for the fraud relating to the discrepancy between the published cost of climate regulation and the internally calculated costs, New York Attorney General Underwood's complaint alleged, "Through its fraudulent scheme, Exxon in effect erected a Potemkin village to create the illusion that it had fully considered the risks of future climate change regulation and had factored those risks into its business operations."
 During the 2020 COVID-19 pandemic, the UK government set a target of 100,000 daily tests before the end of April 2020. On 30 April 2020, Matt Hancock, the Secretary of State for Health and Social Care, declared the target to have been met. This claim was widely disputed when it emerged that the government "changed the way it counts the number of COVID-19 tests"; some 40,000 of the total were home-test kits which had been sent out by mail, but not yet completed. The government's misleading claims were later challenged by the UK Statistics Authority, and described as a "Potemkin testing regime" by Aditya Chakrabortty in an opinion piece for The Guardian.
 On 6 March 2022, two weeks into the Russian invasion of Ukraine, former Russian foreign minister Andrei Kozyrev described the Russian armed forces as a "Potemkin military" in a Twitter post, in light of its logistics troubles and failure to progress on its objectives. He explained that "The Kremlin spent the last 20 years trying to modernize its military. Much of that budget was stolen and spent on mega-yachts in Cyprus. But as a military advisor you cannot report that to the President. So they reported lies to him instead." The Modern War Institute similarly used the phrase "Potemkin army" in a May 2022 article.
 On 24 March 2022, a statement from a White House official referred to the reopening of the Moscow stock exchange as a "Potemkin market opening" due to the significant limits Russian authorities imposed on trading, including a ban on shorting stocks and a ban on foreigners selling stocks.

In the United States legal system 
"Potemkin village" is a phrase that has been used by American judges, especially members of a multiple-judge panel who dissent from the majority's opinion on a particular matter, to refer to an inaccurate or tortured interpretation and/or application of a particular legal doctrine to the specific facts at issue. Use of the phrase is meant to imply that the reasons espoused by the panel's majority in support of its decision are not based on accurate or sound law, and their restrictive application is merely a masquerade for the court's desire to avoid a difficult decision. For example, in Planned Parenthood of Southeastern Pennsylvania v. Casey (1992), chief justice of the United States William Rehnquist wrote that Roe v. Wade "stands as a sort of judicial Potemkin Village, which may be pointed out to passers-by as a monument to the importance of adhering to precedent".  Similarly, Judge William G. Young of the District of Massachusetts described the use of affidavits in U.S. litigation as "the Potemkin Village of today’s litigation landscape" because "adjudication by affidavit is like walking down a street between two movie sets, all lawyer-painted façade and no interior architecture."

Other uses 

Sometimes, instead of the full phrase, just "Potemkin" is used, as an adjective. For example, the use of a row of trees to screen a clearcut area from motorists has been called a "Potemkin forest". For example, the glossary entry for "clearcut" in We Have The Right To Exist: A Translation of Aboriginal Indigenous Thought states that "Much of the extensive clearcut in northern Minnesota is insulated from scrutiny by the urbanized public by a Potemkin forest, or, as the D.N.R. terms it, an aesthetic strip – a thin illusion of forest about six trees deep, along most highways and fronting waters frequented by tourists." Another example is the phrase "Potemkin court", which implies that the court's reason to exist is being called into question (differing from the phrase "kangaroo court" with which the court's standard of justice is being impugned).

In the Old West of the United States, Western false front architecture was often used to create the illusion of affluence and stability in a new frontier town. The style included a tall vertical facade with a square top in front of a wood-framed building, often hiding a gable roof. The goal for the architecture was to project an image of stability and success for the town, while the business owners did not invest much in buildings that might be temporary. These towns often did not last long before becoming ghost towns, so businessmen wanted to get started quickly but did not want to spend a lot on their stores. Many Western movies feature this kind of architecture because, just like the original buildings, it is quick and cheap to create.

Many of the newly constructed base areas at ski resorts are referred to as Potemkin villages. These create the illusion of a quaint mountain town, but are actually carefully planned theme shopping centers, hotels and restaurants designed for maximum revenue. Similarly, in The Geography of Nowhere, American writer James Howard Kunstler refers to contemporary suburban shopping centers as "Potemkin village shopping plazas".

Hardcore punk band Propagandhi released an album in 2005 called Potemkin City Limits. The cover depicts children playing in a city that is drawn on the ground, a façade city. Their 2009 album Supporting Caste has a song called "Potemkin City Limits", about the statue of Francis the Pig in Red Deer, Alberta, Canada.

See also 
 Theresienstadt (1944 film)
 Czech Dream
 Disneyfication
 Potemkin Island
 The Truman Show
 Legends of Catherine the Great
 Novorossiya, New Russia, historical region in the Russian Empire
 Folly, architecture vernacular
 Façadism
 Sportswashing
 Kijong-dong

References

Bibliography 
 EircomTribunal, "2003 Potemkin Village Award," EircomTribunal.com, 
 * Goldberg, Jonah.  National Review, 19 April 2000.
 Ivan Katchanovski and La Porte, Todd. "Cyberdemocracy or Potemkin E-Villages? Electronic Governments in OECD and Post-Communist Countries," International Journal of Public Administration, Volume 28, Number 7–8, July 2005. 
 Ledeen, Michael. "Potemkin WMDs? Really?", National Review, 2 February 2004 
 Smith, Douglas (ed. and trans). Love and Conquest: Personal Correspondence of Catherine the Great and Prince Grigory Potemkin 
 Potemkin Court as a description of The Foreign Intelligence Surveillance Court (from the Washington Post)
 Potemkin Parliament as a description of the European Parliament (New Statesman, 20 September 2004)
 Sullivan, Kevin. "Borderline Absurdity", Washington Post, 11 January 1998.
 Buchan, James. "Potemkin democracy" as a description of Russia. "New Statesman", 17 July 2006.

 External links 
 New York Review of Books, "An Affair to Remember", review by Simon Sebag Montefiore of Douglas Smith, Love and Conquest: Personal Correspondence of Catherine the Great and Prince Grigory Potemkin''
 Smith, Douglas. Love and Conquest: Personal Correspondence of Catherine the Great and Prince Grigory Potemkin

Hoaxes in Russia
Fictitious entries
1787 in the Russian Empire
Propaganda techniques
Propaganda
Deception